Gaythorne railway station is located on the Ferny Grove line in Queensland, Australia. It serves the Brisbane suburb of Gaythorne.

History
The station was built in 1916 and originally named Rifle Range Station. It was built as an extension of the Ferny Grove line from Enoggera to service the new military camps established in the area during World War 1, such as Bells Paddock. After the war, in 1923, a petition was circulated calling for the station's named to be changed to Gaythorne after the closure of the wartime camps.

Services
Gaythorne station is served by all stops Ferny Grove line services from Ferny Grove to Roma Street, Park Road, Coopers Plains and Beenleigh.

Services by platform

References

External links

Gaythorne station Queensland Rail
Gaythorne station Queensland's Railways on the Internet
[ Gaythorne station] TransLink travel information

Railway stations in Brisbane
Railway stations in Australia opened in 1916